Eric Brown may refer to:

Arts and entertainment
Eric Brown (museum director) (1877–1939), director of the National Gallery of Canada
Eric Brown (writer) (born 1960), British science fiction author
Eric Brown (actor) (born 1964), American film and TV actor
Eric Brown (painter) (born 1967), American painter, art advisor, and editor
Eric S. Brown (born 1975), American science fiction and horror novelist

Sports
Eric Brown (golfer) (1925–1986), Scottish golfer
Eric Brown (wide receiver) (born 1964), American football wide receiver 
Eric Brown (weightlifter) (born 1969), weightlifter from American Samoa
Eric Brown (safety) (born 1975), American football safety
Eric Brown (footballer) (born 1990), Liberian footballer
Eric Brown (baseball) (born 2000), American baseball player

Others
Eric Brown (judge) (born 1953), American jurist, Chief Justice of the Ohio Supreme Court
Eric Brown (pilot) (1919–2016), British test pilot
Eric Brown (politician), New York politician
Eric D. Brown (fl. 1990s–2000s), United States Air Force officer